This is a list of Georgian billionaires based on an annual assessment of wealth and assets compiled and published by Forbes magazine in 2021.

2021 Georgian billionaires list

See also
 The World's Billionaires
 List of countries by the number of billionaires

References

Lists of people by wealth
Net worth
 
Billionaires